Marie's Disease may refer to:
Ankylosing spondylitis
Hypertrophic pulmonary osteoarthropathy